Angela Nunag (born December 21, 1991) is a Filipino volleyball athlete. She is currently plays for the Army Black Mamba Lady Troopers in the Premier Volleyball League.

Volleyball career
Nunag plays as the Libero of the Philippine Army Lady Troopers in 2012 up to 2016.

In 2017, she played for the Creamline Cool Smashers and her team became Bronze medalist in the 2017 PVL Open Conference.

In 2018, she transferred back to Philippine Army Lady Troopers and she won best Libero in 2019.

In 2020, she played for the Petron Blaze Spikers in the PSL but the tournament was cancelled because of the COVID-19 pandemic.

In 2021, she played again for the Philippine Army Lady Troopers. In 2023, she became the captain of her team in the 2023 PVL All-Filipino Conference.

Clubs
  Philippine Army Lady Troopers - (2011-2016, 2018-2020, 2021-present)
  Generika-Army Lady Troopers - (2014)
  RC Cola-Army Troopers (2016)
  Creamline Cool Smashers - (2017)
  Smart-Army Giga Hitters - (2018)
  Petron Blaze Spikers - (2020)

Awards

Individual

Clubs

References 

Filipino women's volleyball players
Liberos
1991 births
Living people